Mare Nostrum is a Roman term for the Mediterranean Sea.

Mare Nostrum may also refer to:

Film and TV
 Mare Nostrum (1926 film), an American silent film
 Mare Nostrum (1948 film), an Italian-Spanish film
 Mare Nostrum (2016 film), a French-Syrian-Jordanian film

Music
Ensemble Mare Nostrum, Andrea de Carlo, classical music ensemble on the Arcana Records label recording Alessandro Stradella
Mare Nostrum, jazz trio that includes Swedish pianist Jan Lundgren, or the self-title albums by the group
Mare Nostrum, album by Hecq
 Mare Nostrum (album), a 2008 album by Stormlord

Other 
 MareNostrum, a supercomputer
 Mare Nostrum (board game)
 Mare Nostrum (swimming), a swimming competition
 Mare Nostrum (video game)
 Operation Mare Nostrum, an Italian naval operation
 Mare Nostrum (novel), a 1918 Spanish-language spy novel by Vicente Blasco Ibáñez, filmed as Torrent 1926

See also 
 Mare nostro (disambiguation)